JCVD is an initialism standing for Jean-Claude Van Damme.

JCVD may also refer to 

 JCVD (film)
 "JCVD" (Jul song)
 "JCVD" (Ledeni song)
 "JCVD" (commercial)

Initialisms